Peter Greco (born 19 July 1946) was a Canadian soccer player who earned three caps for the national team in 1968. He played club football for Vancouver Columbus and the Vancouver Whitecaps. He also represented Canada at the 1967 and 1971 Pan American Games.

References

External links
NASL career stats

Living people
Canada men's international soccer players
Canadian soccer players
Association football goalkeepers
Italian emigrants to Canada
North American Soccer League (1968–1984) players
North American Soccer League (1968–1984) indoor players
Vancouver Columbus players
Vancouver Whitecaps (1974–1984) players
Pan American Games competitors for Canada
Footballers at the 1967 Pan American Games
Footballers at the 1971 Pan American Games
1946 births